The 2011 BDO Canadian Open of Curling in December was held from December 14 to 18 at the K-Rock Centre in Kingston, Ontario. It was the second Grand Slam event of the 2011–12 curling season and the eleventh time the tournament has been held. The purse was CAD$100,000.

In the final, Mike McEwen won the final over Jeff Stoughton in seven ends with a score of 5–2. He successfully defended his title from the last edition of the BDO Canadian Open, won his first Grand Slam title of the year, and won his third career Grand Slam title.

Five-rock rule
A new five-rock rule was implemented at this edition of the Canadian Open. The rule, a slight alteration to the free guard zone rule, was tested at the event in an attempt to increase offence in the game. The new rule was predicted to favour teams who play more offence, as the rule allows for a fifth guard to be placed in the free guard zone. However, concerns were raised that the new rule may possibly hinder teams that are more defence-oriented, an opinion echoed by the Canadian Curling Association. Since the Canadian Open is a Grand Slam event, the Open carried many points on the Canadian Team Ranking System, which plays a role in determining Olympic trials participants. If a team were to miss qualifying for the 2013 trials because of a poor performance at the Open influenced by the five rock rule, the team could raise complaints to the CCA. As a result, the CCA stated that it would not sanction the event unless all players participating in the Open express written consent in regards to the five-rock rule. Not all players had agreed not to challenge the outcome of the Open, but the event went ahead as planned, with the five-rock rule in place.

Teams

Round-robin standings
Final round-robin standings

*Kevin Martin advances directly to the playoffs by virtue of a draw to the button contest between Kevin Koe, Jean-Michel Ménard, and Martin.

Round-robin results

Draw 1
Wednesday, December 14, 7:30 pm

Draw 2
Thursday, December 15, 9:00 am

Draw 3
Thursday, December 15, 12:30 pm

Draw 4
Thursday, December 15, 4:00 pm

Draw 5
Thursday, December 15, 7:30 pm

Draw 6
Friday, December 16, 9:00 am

Draw 7
Friday, December 16, 12:30 pm

Draw 8
Friday, December 16, 4:00 pm

Draw 9
Friday, December 16, 7:30 pm

Tiebreaker
Saturday, December 17, 9:30

Playoffs

Quarterfinals
Saturday, December 17, 2:00 pm

Semifinals
Saturday, December 17, 7:00 pm

Final
Sunday, December 18, 1:00 pm

References

External links
Event Home Page
Final on YouTube

2011-12
2011 in Canadian curling
Sport in Kingston, Ontario
Curling in Ontario
BDO Canadian
December 2011 sports events in Canada